Marina Alex (born August 2, 1990) is an American professional golfer.

Raised in Wayne, New Jersey, Alex played interscholastic golf at Wayne Hills High School, where she won individual state titles in 2007 and 2008.

Alex played college golf at Vanderbilt University. She won one tournament, the 2010 SEC Championship. She qualified for the 2009 U.S. Women's Open as an amateur but missed the cut.

Alex turned professional in 2012 following the NCAA Championship. She played on the Symetra Tour in 2012 and 2013 with a best finish of second at the 2013 Four Winds Invitational. She finished third on the money list in 2013 to earn an LPGA Tour card for 2014.

Alex has played on the LPGA Tour since 2014 and won her first event at the 2018 Cambia Portland Classic.

She won for only the second time on May 1, 2022, with a 10-under-par 274, beating the number 1 ranked Ko Jin-young by one stroke, both shooting a final round 66. Lydia Ko and Megan Khang tied for third at 276. She was ranked 61st in the world before her win, and earned 53 points for a gain of 33 rankings to 28 on May 2, 2022.

Amateur wins
2010 SEC Women's Championship

Source:

Professional wins (2)

LPGA Tour wins (2)

Results in LPGA majors
Results not in chronological order before 2019.

^ The Evian Championship was added as a major in 2013

CUT = missed the half-way cut
NT = no tournament
T = tied

Summary

Most consecutive cuts made – 13 (2016 British – 2019 ANA)
Longest streak of top-10s – 1 (once)

LPGA Tour career summary

^ Official as of May 1, 2022
*Includes matchplay and other tournaments without a cut.

World ranking
Position in Women's World Golf Rankings at the end of each calendar year.

Team appearances
Professional
Solheim Cup (representing the United States): 2019

Solheim Cup record

References

External links

American female golfers
LPGA Tour golfers
Golfers from New Jersey
Vanderbilt Commodores women's golfers
People from Wayne, New Jersey
Sportspeople from Passaic County, New Jersey
Wayne Hills High School alumni
1990 births
Living people
20th-century American women
21st-century American women